Junaidi Bakhtiar (born 29 November 1995) is an Indonesian professional footballer who plays as a goalkeeper for Liga 2 club PSIM Yogyakarta.

Club career

Persik Kediri
He was signed for Persik Kediri to play in Liga 2 in the 2019 season. On 25 November 2019 Persik successfully won the 2019 Liga 2 Final and promoted to Liga 1, after defeating Persita Tangerang 3–2 at the Kapten I Wayan Dipta Stadium, Gianyar.

PSIM Yogyakarta
In 2021, Junaidi signed a contract with Indonesian Liga 2 club PSIM Yogyakarta. He made his league debut on 26 September in a 1–0 loss against PSCS Cilacap at the Manahan Stadium, Surakarta.

Honours

Club 
Persik Kediri
 Liga 2: 2019

References

External links
 Junaidi Bakhtiar at Soccerway

1995 births
Living people
Indonesian footballers
Persik Kediri players
Association football goalkeepers
Sportspeople from Lampung